Leka is an Albanian male name and surname. In the Balkans, it has spread in the forms Lecca (Romanian), Lekkas (Greek), Lekić (Serbo-Croatian).

As toponym 
Lekaj is  a village and a former municipality situated in the central plains of Albania's Western Lowlands region. It is part of Tirana County.
Lekaj (Hysgjokaj) is a village in the commune of Hysgjokaj in the district of Lushnja in Albania .
Lekas is a village in Dardhas commune in Pogradec district in Albania .
Lekas another village in Lekas commune in Korça district in Albania
Λέκα Σάμου is a village of Samos, built at the northeastern foot of Mount Kerkis, near the town of Karlovasi, which might be derived from Albanian
Lekël is a village in Gjirokastër County

Given name
Leka (Paulician leader) a Byzantine Paulician, possibly of Albanian birth
Lekë Dukagjini Albanian Nobleman who canonized the doke
Lekë Matrënga  1567 – 6 May 1619) was an Arbëresh writer and Catholic priest of Byzantine rite in the Albanian community of Sicily.
Leca of Cătun was probably a Wallachian political figure of Albanian origin, prominent under Princes Michael the Brave, Radu Șerban, and Radu Mihnea. 
Lekë Zaharia an Arbëresh writer.
Lekë Dushmani one of the founders of League of Lezhë
Leka, Crown Prince of Albania (born 1939)  only son of King Zog I and Queen Geraldine of Albania. 
Leka, Crown Prince of Albania (born 1982) the claimant to the defunct throne of Albania and the head of the House of Zogu.
Leka Bungo is an Albanian director, actor, and screenwriter. born 1944.
Leka Gjiknuri (1942 -1998) born in Kudhës, Himara, was a member of the Academy of Natural Sciences in New York and Paris
Leka Ndoja (born in Tirana, 1962) is a researcher of literature and history and an Albanian translator.

See Also
Lek (disambiguation)
Lekaj
Lecca

References

Albanian masculine given names
Albanian-language surnames